Galena is a mineral and an important lead ore.

Galena may also refer to:

Places

Canada
Galena Bay, British Columbia, a ferry terminal, community and bay
Galena Island, an uninhabited island in Nunavut
Galena Pass, a low mountain pass on BC 31 near Galena Bay

United States
Galena, Alaska, a city
Galena, Idaho, a former mining town
Galena, Illinois, a city and county seat
Galena Historic District
Galena, Indiana, a census-designated place
Galena, Kansas, a city
Galena, Maryland, a town
Galena, Missouri, a city
Galena, Lander County, Nevada, a ghost town
Galena, Washoe County, Nevada, a town abandoned after 1867
Galena, Ohio, a village
Galena, Oregon, a ghost town
Galena, South Dakota, an unincorporated community
Galena, Washington, an unincorporated community
Galena River (Illinois)
Galena River (Indiana)
Galena Summit, a high mountain pass in central Idaho
Galena Township (disambiguation)
Lake Galena (Illinois), a reservoir
Lake Galena (Pennsylvania), a reservoir

Businesses
 Galena Biopharma, American pharmaceutical company
 Galena Hotel, originally known as the Fox River House, historic hotel in Aurora, Illinois
 Galena Lodge, cross-country skiing resort in Idaho
 Ivax Pharmaceuticals, a company previously known as "Galena"

Persons
 Galena (singer), Bulgarian pop folk singer
 Ayelet Galena (2009–2012), child born with the rare genetic disorder dyskeratosis congenita

Others
Galena Group, a sedimentary sequence of Ordovician limestone that was deposited atop the Decorah Shale
Galena High School (disambiguation)
Galena Nuclear Power Plant, proposed nuclear power plant in Galena, Alaska
, three U.S. Navy ships
Galena, a cultivar of hops
Galena class, a U.S. Navy class of 19th century sloops of war

See also
 Galena River (disambiguation)
 Galene (disambiguation)
 Galina (disambiguation)
 Garena, video game developer